The Ministry of Economy and Sustainable Development is a ministry of the government of Georgia in charge of regulating economic activity in the country. Its head office is in Tbilisi. It is currently headed by Natela Turnava.

Structure
The Ministry of Economic Development was established after dissolution of Soviet Union. It was renamed to Ministry of Economy and Sustainable Development during government restructuring in 2010.
 
The main functions of the ministry are to provide incentives for economic growth in the country utilizing an effective economic policy. The economic policies of the state are described in the action plan of the Georgian Government for 2004–2009 titled For United and Powerful Georgia. The policies include utilization of macroeconomic policy and private entrepreneurship development. The economic reforms undertaken by the government include liberalization of entrepreneurial activities, creation of favorable, transparent and stable legislation for private business owners; realization of active privatization process and support to strengthening of private sector; facilitation of issuance of licenses and permits and reform of the system of technical regulation; economic deregulation and protection of markets against monopolization; development of tourism, transport and communication infrastructure, etc.

Sub-agencies
 United Transport Administration

Ministers
Vladimir Papava, 1994–2000
Ivane Chkhartishvili, 2000–2001
Giorgi Gachechiladze, 2001–2003
Irakli Rekhviashvili, November 2003 – June 2004
Kakha Bendukidze, June 2004 – December 2004
Lekso Aleksishvili, December 2004 – June 2005 
Irakli Chogovadze, June 2005 – November 2006
Irakli Okruashvili, November 2006
Giorgi Arveladze, November 2006 – January 2008
Eka Sharashidze, January 2008 – December 2008
Lasha Zhvania, December 2008 – August 2009
Zurab Pololikashvili, August 2009 – July 2010
Vera Kobalia, July 2010–25 October 2012
Giorgi Kvirikashvili, 25 October 2012 – 2015
Dimitri Kumsishvili, 1 September 2015 – 2018
Giorgi Kobulia, 1 September 2018 – 18 April 2019
Natela Turnava, 18 April 2019 – 9 February 2022
Levan Davitashvili, 9 February 2022 - Present

References

External links

 Ministry of Economy and Sustainable Development
 Ministry of Economy and Sustainable Development 

Economy and Sustainable Development
Georgia
Economy of Georgia (country)
1992 establishments in Georgia (country)
Georgia